The Akaflieg München Mü30 Schlacro (SCHLepp-ACRObatic) is a high performance two-seat glider tug and aerobatic aircraft designed and built in Germany from 1985.

Development 
Students at Akaflieg München recognized that the requirements of an aerobatic aircraft and glider tug coincided, both needing a high power-to-weight ratio, high rate of climb at relatively low speed, and high control authority. To meet these requirements design and construction of the Mü30 began in 1985. Initially it was intended to fit a Porsche PFM 3200, obtained from Porsche at no cost. Use of the PFM 3200 promised to cut operating costs and environmental impact dramatically, with the engine certified to use MOGAS in place of the very expensive AVGAS, but Porsche abandoned development of the PFM3200 in 1992, leaving the Mü30 without an engine.

During development the ailerons were optimized for maximum roll rate, the wings revised with carbonfibre structure and the center of gravity adjusted by moving the wings  forward, compensating for a heavier Lycoming engine and ensuring reserve for possible future re-design.

Work on the prototype continued and an alternative engine installation was designed for the 223 kW (300 hp) Lycoming AEIO-540 driving a four-bladed propeller. First flight with the Lycoming engine was carried out in 2000 with flight testing continuing till 2003. Problems with cooling the Lycoming engine necessitated the complete re-design of the cooling air intake, exhaust system and cowling.

Flying re-commenced on 16 February 2007, resuming flight tests which, so far, have proved to be satisfactory and certification is well advanced. Initial problems with lateral stability have been overcome by altering the control geometry and flight tests  by Uli Schell have revealed the aircraft to have adequate stability and be easy to control. Flight testing was completed by New Year's Eve 2007, with the exception of Vd (Maximum Design Dive Speed – 1.2x Vne) which had earlier highlighted problems with the elevator trim. After thickening the trailing edge of the elevators the trim problems were alleviated and the Vd test was carried out successfully.

Specifications (Mü30)

Gallery

References

External links

Homepage of Akaflieg München e.V.
YouTube video

2000s German civil utility aircraft
Glider tugs
Mu30
Aerobatic aircraft
Single-engined tractor aircraft
Low-wing aircraft
Aircraft first flown in 2000